James Berry (8 February 1852 – 21 October 1913) was an English executioner from 1884 until 1891. Berry was born in Heckmondwike in the West Riding of Yorkshire, where his father worked as a wool-stapler. His most important contribution to the science of hanging was his refinement of the long drop method developed by William Marwood, whom Berry knew quite well. His improvements were intended to diminish mental and physical suffering and some of them remained standard practice until the abolition of capital punishment for murder.

An insight into Berry's behaviour and methods can be read in the book My Experiences as an Executioner, in which he describes his methods and recalls the final moments of some of the people he executed.

Early life
He served eight years with the Bradford Police Force, then tried himself as a boot salesman. Since he did not earn enough for the upkeep of his family, he applied for the post of executioner after William Marwood died in 1883 but was unsuccessful despite being shortlisted, until the short period of Bartholomew Binns in office was over.

Berry was the first British hangman literate and communicative enough to be able to write freely about his work. He considered that the hangman was the last link in what he called the "chain of legal retribution".

Career incidents
He was the executioner who failed to hang John Babbacombe Lee – "The Man They Couldn't Hang" – in 1885. After three attempts, in which the trap door repeatedly failed to open, Lee's sentence was commuted to life imprisonment.

During the execution of Robert Goodale on 30 November 1885 at Norwich, the drop used was too long, and Goodale was decapitated by the rope.

Berry's time in office came to an end following interference in his judgement by the prison medical officer at Kirkdale Prison regarding the appropriate length of drop; Berry compromised but the condemned man John Conway was nearly decapitated. In March 1892 Berry wrote his letter of resignation, probably without knowing that in October of the previous year the Home Office had already decided that "the employment of Berry as Executioner should no longer be recommended to the High Sheriffs."

Berry carried out 131 hangings in his seven years in office, including those of five women. In 1889, he hanged William Bury, a man suspected by some of being Jack the Ripper. In his book My Experiences as an Executioner James Berry makes no mention of the Whitechapel murders for which there have always been multiple suspects. However, his belief that Bury and "Jack the Ripper" were one and the same was published in his memoirs which appeared in Thomson's Weekly News of 12 February 1927.

Later life
Following his retirement, Berry toured as an evangelist and gave lectures on phrenology. In his book The Hangman's Thoughts Above the Gallows (1905) he complains that "the law of capital punishment falls with terrible weight upon the hangman and that to allow a man to follow such an occupation is doing him a deadly wrong".

Smith Wigglesworth, the evangelist and preacher, records his conversion to Christianity, in a sermon which was later published in Faith that Prevails (1938):

Following his conversion to Christianity, James Berry became a prominent campaigner for the abolition of the death penalty.

Berry died at Walnut Tree Farm, 36 Bolton Lane, Bradford, West Yorkshire, on 21 October 1913.

His writing
 The Hangman's Thoughts Above the Gallows (1905)
 My Experiences as an Executioner, London : P. Lund, [1892] (via Internet Archive)

See also
List of executioners
Official Table of Drops

Notes

Bibliography

Further reading
 Atholl, Justin, Shadow of the Gallows, London, John Long, 1954.
 Atholl, Justin, The Reluctant Hangman, London, John Long, 1956.
 Bailey, Brian, Hangmen of England, London, W. H. Allen, 1989.
 Bleackley, Horace, The Hangmen of England, London, Chapman and Hall, 1929.
 Duff, Charles, A New Handbook on Hanging, London, Andrew Melrose, 1954.
 Evans, Stewart P., Executioner. The Chronicles of James Berry, Victorian Hangman, Sutton Publishing (2004), 
 Fielding, Steve, The Hangman's Record, Vol. One, 1868–1899, Beckenham, Chancery House Press, 1994.
 Furniss, Harold, 'James Berry Constable, Bootmaker and Hangman' in Famous Crimes Past and Present, Vol. IV, no. 44, n.d. (c.1904).
 Goodman, Jonathan, and Bill Waddell, The Black Museum, London, Harrap, 1987.
 Hywel-Davies, Jack, 'Baptised By Fire' The story of Smith Wigglesworth, 1987. (Pages 47-48).
 Laurence, John, A History of Capital Punishment, London, Sampson Low, Marston & Co., n.d.
 Potter, Harry, Hanging in Judgement, London, SCM Press, 1993.
 Scott, George Ryley, The History of Capital Punishment, London, Torchstream Books, 1950.
 Smith, Lieut Col Sir Henry, From Constable To Commissioner, London, Chatto & Windus, 1910.
 Tod, T. M., The Scots Black Kalendar, Perth, Monro & Scott, 1938.
 Young, Alex F., The Encyclopaedia of Scottish Executions, Orpington, Eric Dobby, 1998.
 Sheridan, Michael, The murder at Shandy Hall, 2010.

External links
 
 

1852 births
1913 deaths
People from Heckmondwike
English executioners
British police officers